Municipal Basketball Club Mykolaiv (in Ukrainian: Муніципальний Баскетбольний Клуб Миколаїв), commonly known as simply Mykolaiv, is a  professional basketball team (club) of Mykolaiv, Ukraine. They currently play in the Ukrainian SL Favorit Sport.

History
In 2009, the team finished in fifth place in the Ukrainian Men's Basketball SuperLeague. In the 2009 NBA Draft basketball player Sergiy Gladyr was the 49th draft pick, in the second round by the Atlanta Hawks, but did not succeed in the teams' request. For the 2015–16 season, they joined the Ukrainian SL Favorit Sport.

Season by season

Names 
Through the years, MBC Mykolaiv has known several names:
 1972—1977: Spartak (Nikolaev)
 1977—1994: NKI (Nikolaev)
 1994—2000: SK Mykolaiv
 since 2000: MBC Mykolaiv

Honours 
Ukrainian Basketball SuperLeague
 Runner-up (1): 1992
Third place (2): 1992–93, 1997–98

Players

Current squad

External links

References 

Basketball teams in Ukraine
Sport in Mykolaiv
Basketball teams in the Soviet Union
Basketball teams established in 1967
1967 establishments in Ukraine